Dr Charles Syrett Farrell Easmon, CBE, MRCP, FRCPath, FMedSci, (born 20 August 1946), is a British microbiologist and medical professor who has made significant contributions to medical education in Britain. He is a descendant of the distinguished Easmon family.

Education
Charles Easmon attended Epsom College and qualified with an M.B.B.S, M.R.C.S. and L.R.C.P. from St Mary's Hospital Medical School in 1969. Between 1975 and 1976, he qualified with an MRCPath and a PhD, and in 1981, Easmon gained an M.D.

Career
After qualifying as a medical doctor, Easmon specialised in Medical Microbiology and in 1976 was appointed as the senior lecturer at St Mary's Hospital Medical School in addition to being an honorary consultant at St Mary's hospital. In 1980, Easmon was appointed a Reader in Bacteriology and became the head of the Medical Microbiology department at St. Mary's Hospital Medical School. Easmon was the first Clinical Director of Pathology in 1989 at St Mary's Hospital and became Dean of Postgraduate Medicine in the University of London.

In 1995, Easmon was appointed as the Director of Education and Training for North Thames and he was responsible for the Education and Training levies and the education Consortia in North Thames. In 2003, Easmon became professor of health policy at the Thames Valley University and retired in 2010 after being appointed emeritus professor. Easmon was a Founding Fellow of the Academy of Medical Sciences.

Recognition
Dr C.S.F. Easmon was listed in the 2000 New Year Honours list and in 2000 he was made a Commander of the Order of the British Empire for his contributions to medical education.

Selected works
Medical Microbiology Series (Volume I-V)
The induction and control of cell-mediated hypersensitivity to staphylococcus aureus in mice
The Diagnosis and Management of Bacterial Vaginosis (Round Table)

References
https://web.archive.org/web/20140723071722/http://cptpcevent.co.uk/speakers
https://web.archive.org/web/20160305045401/http://www.health-old.uwl.ac.uk/research/about.asp
http://news.bbc.co.uk/1/hi/special_report/1999/12/99/new_years_honours/584140.stm
Physicians, Colonial Racism and Diaspora in West Africa
https://web.archive.org/web/20130625131234/http://www.hpa.org.uk/NewsCentre/NationalPressReleases/2010PressReleases/100325executiveappointments/
http://investing.businessweek.com/research/stocks/private/person.asp?personId=54139477&privcapId=7982658&previousCapId=7982658&previousTitle=Health+Protection+Agency+(UK)
https://web.archive.org/web/20140302172144/http://www.cieh.org/events/leading-the-new-public-health.html

1946 births
Commanders of the Order of the British Empire
Living people
People educated at Epsom College
MacCormac family of County Armagh, Northern Ireland
Charles Syrett Farrell